Aidomaggiore is a comune (municipality) in the Province of Oristano in Sardinia, Italy.

Aidomaggiore borders the following municipalities: Borore, Dualchi, Ghilarza, Norbello, Sedilo, Soddì.

References

External links

 Official website

Cities and towns in Sardinia